"Time Is Up" is a song by American singer Poppy featuring American DJ and producer Diplo, released on August 22, 2018, as the second single from Poppy's second studio album Am I a Girl?

It is an electropop and dance-pop song about the end of humans and the rise of robots. The cover art features Poppy with electrode patches on her head, which is also a recurring scene in the music video. The music video was released along with the song.

Reception
Idolator's Mike Wass called the song an "apocalyptic electropop anthem about the end of the human race", and noted Poppy's robotic vocal delivery as well as the song's "ominous" chorus. Steph Evans of Dancing Astronaut said the song is "infectious modern pop underlined by Diplo's production".

Promotion
Poppy teased her collaboration with Diplo on social media in August, posting an image of her with the electrode patches on her temples from the music video. She first performed the song on television in September 2018 in an appearance on The Late Late Show with James Corden.

Music video
The music video was directed by Titanic Sinclair and released in August 2018, and features Poppy giving a pill to various human test subjects. It depicts a retelling of Poppy's rise to fame in a futuristic dystopian world. Idolator called the video "suitably chilling" to match the song. It has received over seven million views on YouTube since its release.

Track listing

Die-cut picture disc
 "Time Is Up" (featuring Diplo)
 "In a Minute"

Release history

References

2018 singles
2018 songs
Poppy (entertainer) songs
Songs written by Diplo
Songs written by Simon Wilcox
Song recordings produced by Diplo
Songs written by Titanic Sinclair